Magnolia yunnanensis is a species of tree in the family Magnoliaceae, native to evergreen broad-leaved forests in eastern Asia, southern China and Indochina.

Richard Figlar notes that Magnolia yunnanensis is "often cultivated as street trees in their native Yunnan because of their 'Gallery Pear-type' growth habit and their exceptionally glossy evergreen foliage". He also notes that "their flowers are not as profuse and are less showy than those of other magnolia species".

Gallery

References

yunnanensis
Plants described in 1951